Pan Sutong JP, is a Hong Kong billionaire businessman. He is the founder of Matsunichi Digital Holdings Limited, and the chairman of Goldin Real Estate Financial Holdings Limited (also known as Goldin Group).

Biography
Pan Sutong was born in Shaoguan, Guangdong, China in 1963. He emigrated to the US in 1976, and then moved to Hong Kong in 1984 and started trading with electronics brands like Panasonic. In 1993, he founded Matsunichi Colour Display Monitor Company Limited, the main business of which is the manufacturing of home appliances. In 2002, he bought Hong Kong listed company Emperor Technology Venture Limited and had it renamed as Matsunichi Communication Holdings Limited. On 3 September 2008, this company was further renamed as Goldin Properties Holdings Limited. In late 2008, Sutong bought another Hong Kong listed company, Fortuna International Holdings Limited, and had it renamed as Goldin Financial Holdings Limited. Sutong privatized Goldin Properties Holdings Limited through a cash offer with the compulsory acquisition of all shares completed on 17 August 2017, the listing of shares of the company was withdrawn from the Hong Kong Stock Exchange on 18 August 2017.

Goldin Group includes Goldin Properties Holdings Limited, Goldin Financial Holdings Limited, Goldin Equities Limited, Matsunichi Digital Holdings Limited, while Goldin Financial Holdings Limited is listed on the Main Board of Hong Kong Stock Exchange, stock code being 00530.

In 2018, Sutong was elected a member of the 13th National Committee of the Chinese People's Political Consultative Conference.

He received an honorary doctorate in business administration from Lingnan University in November 2018.

In December 2021, it was reported that Sutong had a "privileged" vote in the 2021 Hong Kong legislative election, where the vote would count approximately 7,215 times more than an ordinary citizen.

Business career
He is the Controlling Shareholder, the chairman of the board, the Chairman of the Nomination Committee and the Chairman of the Corporate Governance Committee of Goldin Financial Holdings Limited. He is also the Controlling Shareholder, the non-executive Director and chairman of the board, the chief executive officer, the Chairman of the Nomination Committee, the Chairman of the executive committee and a member of the Remuneration Committee of Goldin Properties Holdings Limited.

According to Forbes 2019 World Billionaire's list, Sutong was placed at number 365 with an estimated net worth of $4.9 billion.

As a polo lover, Sutong is also the Chairman of the Hong Kong Polo Development and Promotion Federation (HKPDPF) and Vice President of the Federation of International Polo (FIP).

In 2015, Sutong made a donation to Lingnan University to establish the Pan Sutong Shanghai-Hong Kong Economic Policy Research Centre to strengthen research on issues related to the economic and financial development of Mainland China and Hong Kong.

In 2017, Pan Sutong, Peter Lam Kin-ngok, Cheng Cheung-ling and Chanchai Ruayrungruang jointly founded the Belt and Road General Chamber of Commerce.

Wine

Sutong is a wine lover. In 2011, Goldin Group bought the 40-acre SLOAN ESTATE winery in the Napa Valley from Stuart Sloan, planted to Cabernet Sauvignon, Merlot, Petit Verdot and Cabernet Franc.  The estate produces the flagship SLOAN and second label ASTERISK.  The SLOAN 2002 and 2007 vintages were awarded 100 points by renowned wine critic Robert Parker.

On 30 May 2013, the Group purchased three more châteaux in Bordeaux, France, namely Château Le Bon Pasteur in Pomerol, Château Rolland-Maillet in Saint-Émilion and Château Bertineau St-Vincent in Lalande-de-Pomerol. The Château Le Bon Pasteur is a Pomerol AOC Bordeaux wine from world-renowned consulting oenologist Michel Rolland. As Goldin Financial's long-term working partner, Michel Rolland facilitated this acquisition. Similar to SLOAN, despite the transfer of ownership, all the wine-making procedures and processes at the châteaux will remain the same and be done by the same staff.

Polo

Sutong is the Chairman of the non-profit-making Hong Kong Polo Development and Promotion Federation. In December 2012, Sutong was elected as Vice President of the Federation of International Polo in the FIP Annual General Meeting. Tianjin Goldin Metropolitan Polo Club, which opened in November 2010, is owned by Sutong's Goldin Group. The club has held a number of international polo tournaments since its opening in November 2010, including Goldin International Snow Polo Challenge 2011, Goldin Cold Cup 2011, Goldin U18 Cup 2011, Fortune Heights Snow Polo World Cup 2012–2017, Fortune Heights Super Nations Cup 2012, 2013 and 2014,  Maserati Metropolitan Polo Classic 2013 and 2014, and Metropolitan Intervarsity Polo 2013–2018. In June 2012, 2013, 2014 and 2015, Goldin Group also sponsored the Goldin Charity Day held in Beaufort Polo Club in England, in which both Prince William and Prince Harry participated.

Horses

In 2011, Sutong started participating in horse racing in Hong Kong and purchased a few high-priced thoroughbreds, including Tailwind, Gold-Fun, Akeed Mofeed, Giant Treasure, Obliterator, Consort, Gold Mount and Gold Land. According to news reports, Akeed Mofeed, sired by three-time Group 1 winner Dubawi, was priced as high as 20 million Hong Kong dollars. Akeed Mofeed finished 4th in the Irish Derby 2012 and won the BMW Hong Kong Derby 2013. Akeed Mofeed is also the 1st runner-up of the G2 LONGINES Jockey Club Cup (2000m) at Sha Tin racecourse on Sunday, 17 November, losing only by a diminishing head to Endowing, the champion. On 8 December 2013, Akeed Mofeed was crowned champion of G1 LONGINES Hong Kong Cup.
Akeed Mofeed retired from racing on 6 June 2014 and stands as a stallion at owner Pan Sutong's Goldin Farms, Lindsay Park in South Australia.

Gold-Fun is sired by Le Vie Dei Colori, a fourteen-time winner including the champion of Premio Vittorio Di Capua (GI) of Italy. He is the champion of the Hong Kong Classic Mile 2013 and the 2nd runner-up of BMW Hong Kong Derby 2013. On 1 October 2013, he was crowned champion of the National Day Cup 2013. Gold-Fun continued his victory by winning the G2 BOCHK Wealth Management Jockey Club Mile on 17 November. Gold-Fun stamped his class on the HKG1 Queen's Silver Jubilee Cup (1400m) at Sha Tin racecourse on 16 March 2014, with a commanding half-length victory over the consistently gallant Dan Excel. Gold-Fun had defied a 130lbs burden and a troubled stretch run to land the spoils in the 1400m contest from a star-studded field of rivals, and claimed the trophy of the Celebration Cup held on 5 October 2014. On 15 February 2015, Gold-Fun gained his first victory at a distance short of 1400m at HKG1 1200M The Chairman's Sprint Prize, winning a short-head from Aerovelocity. Gold-Fun continued his victory by winning the G2 BOCHK Wealth Management Jockey Club Sprint from Not Listenin’tome and Peniaphobia.

On 31 January 2016, Giant Treasure claimed his first top-flight victory at the G1 Stewards’ Cup (1600m), winning by a short-head over Luger.

Goldin Australia Pty Ltd, a subsidiary of Sutong's Goldin Group, announced on 12 September 2013 the completion of its acquisition of Lindsay Park Stud in Barossa Valley, South Australia, an esteemed 1257.5-acre horse breeding and training ground, for breeding top thoroughbred racehorses.

On 28 March 2018, Gold Mount won the Class 1 Happy Valley Vase Handicap (1800m), with a head to spare over a swooping Eagle Way.

Celebrity
In 2005, Sutong's Matsunichi engaged Olympic Gold Medalist Michael Phelps as the Spokesperson of Matsunichi MP3 Player. According to news reports, Michael Phelps chose to collaborate with Matsunichi because he enjoyed listening to music to help him relax as well as focus before competition. Apart from doing TV commercials and attending product launching press conferences, as a spokesperson Michael Phelps was often seen using Matsunichi MP3 Player at poolside before competition.

Personal life
He resides in Hong Kong.

Football club
He owned a professional football club Guangzhou Matsunichi F.C. between 1995 and 2000.

References

Hong Kong businesspeople
Businesspeople from Guangdong
People from Shaoguan
1963 births
Living people
Chinese football chairmen and investors